Rekha Rani Das Boro is a senior politician from Assam, India. She has served as the Minister of State for Social Welfare and Sericulture and Weaving and also the Minister of Welfare of Plain Tribes and Backward Classes in the Government of Assam.  Rekha Rani Das Boro is the current State Vice-President of BJP Assam Pradesh. She is the daughter of freedom fighter Biren Das Boro, who was also an MLA.

Career 
Rekha Rani Das Boro began her political career with Asom Gana Parishad (AGP) and served as a senior leader of the party. She switched to BJP in 2019. She was elected as MLA twice from Barama Constituency in 1985 and 1996

References 

Bharatiya Janata Party politicians from Assam
1960 births
Living people
Asom Gana Parishad politicians